Gibbium is a genus of beetles in the family Ptinidae.

Species and distribution:

Gibbium aequinoctiale – Cosmopolitan distribution
Gibbium psylloides – Palearctic, Southeast Asia, North Africa

References

Ptinidae